Tom Dalgliesh is the owner of Columbia Games and a designer of many wargames and fantasy role-playing materials.

Biography
Dalgliesh began his career playing poker as a midshipman in the British Merchant Navy, then emigrated to Canada in 1967.

In 1972, Dalgliesh, Steve Brewster, and Lance Gutteridge formed a new gaming company called Gamma Two Games, which became Columbia Games in 1982. Brewster soon left and Gutteridge departed in the mid-1980s, leaving the company in the hands of Dalgliesh. Dalgliesh's designs, starting with Quebec 1759, include War of 1812, Napoleon, Slapshot, Klondike, Smoker's Wild, Bobby Lee, Sam Grant, Dixie, Eagles, Victory, Pacific Victory, and Liberty.  He also co-designed Wizard Kings with his son Grant Dalgliesh, EastFront with Craig Besinque, Hammer of the Scots, Crusader Rex, and Richard III with Jerry Taylor, and Sam Grant, and Shenandoah with Gary Selkirk.

Dalgliesh also entered into a partnership with N. Robin Crossby to publish a fantasy game called Hârn. Dalgliesh followed what he called a " business strategy" for Columbia (with the intention to produce quality product with limited appeal but loyal following), and had to defend Columbia several times over the higher price of the Hârn books. Dalgliesh's work on the Hârn system includes the sourcebooks Kanday (1986), Kaldor (1986), Azadmere (1986), Melderyn (1987), and Pilots' Almanac (1988). Dalgliesh's company Columbia Games published the original work in 1983, and it has remained continuously in print by that company since then. After a disagreement, this partnership ended and Crossby continued to develop the game without the input of Delgliesh or Columbia Games.

Dalgliesh decided to move Columbia Games from Canada into Washington state in 1994; Crossby did not move with the company and afterward stopped producing new material for Columbia.

Dalgliesh's War of 1812 in Strategy & Tactics magazine from Decision Games won the 2001 Charles S. Roberts Award for Best Magazine Game. His Hammer of the Scots board game won in the category of best historical simulation in the 2004 Games 100 "Top 100 Games of the Year" contest.  He was chosen by vote as a "famous game designer" to be featured as the king of clubs in Flying Buffalo's 2014 Famous Game Designers Playing Card Deck.

Personal life
Dalgliesh now lives in Washington (state), just south of the Canada–US border, and sails as a hobby.

References

External links
Tom Dalgliesh official website

American game designers
Living people
People from Aberdeen
People from Whatcom County, Washington
Year of birth missing (living people)